Chen Qin (born 10 February 1963) is a Chinese former freestyle and medley swimmer who competed in the 1984 Summer Olympics.

References

1963 births
Living people
Chinese male freestyle swimmers
Chinese male medley swimmers
Olympic swimmers of China
Swimmers at the 1984 Summer Olympics
Swimmers at the 1986 Asian Games
Asian Games medalists in swimming
Asian Games silver medalists for China
Medalists at the 1986 Asian Games
20th-century Chinese people